Albert Smailes Wetton (23 October 1928 – 17 December 1996) was an English professional footballer who played as a centre half in the Football League for Brighton & Hove Albion and Crewe Alexandra. He was on the books of Tottenham Hotspur without playing for their first team, and also played non-league football for clubs including Cheshunt, Gravesend & Northfleet and Haywards Heath.

Wetton's brother, Ralph, played professional football for Tottenham Hotspur, Plymouth Argyle and Aldershot.

References

1928 births
1996 deaths
People from Winlaton
Footballers from Tyne and Wear
Footballers from County Durham
English footballers
Association football utility players
Dartford F.C. players
Cheshunt F.C. players
Tottenham Hotspur F.C. players
Brighton & Hove Albion F.C. players
Crewe Alexandra F.C. players
Ebbsfleet United F.C. players
Haywards Heath Town F.C. players
English Football League players
Southern Football League players